The Manobkantha is a Bangla newspaper of Bangladesh. The newspaper is published in Dhaka. In 2018, its circulation was 161,150. The newspaper was founded in 2012, and is owned by Asian Group.

References

Mass media in Bangladesh
Mass media in Dhaka